The crescent-chested warbler (Oreothlypis superciliosa) is a small New World warbler. It is common throughout its montane range, from northern Mexico to northern Nicaragua. It shows an affinity for oaks.

The crescent-chested warbler is superficially similar to both the northern parula and the tropical parula, with yellow underparts, a gray head, and a greenish back, but neither of these has a bold white eyebrow. Adult males have a discrete chestnut crescent on the breast, which is less prominent and sometimes lacking in females and young birds.

Life history

These monogamous, solitary birds become more gregarious in winter, joining mixed-species flocks to feed (mostly insects, but sometimes fruits and berries in the middle to upper levels of trees). It jumps from twigs and foliage, picking food from the underside of leaves, and hanging beneath leaves in a fashion similar to chickadees to check surfaces for prey.

Crescent-chested warblers make their nests atop grassy tussocks or sheltered by a hill or bank near the ground. Usually they will have 1 - 2 broods a year. The female is believed to build the nest without help from the male, gathering moss, grass, conifer needles, and fine materials to line the nest. She will then lay approximately three plain white eggs. Incubation is estimated to last 12 – 14 days by the female. The chicks are altricial and are also brooded by the female, and fed by both sexes. The young stay in the nest for an estimated 8–10 days.

References
 Alsop, Birds of North America

Further reading

External links
 Crescent-chested warbler in Madera Canyon, Arizona

crescent-chested warbler
Birds of Central America
crescent-chested warbler
Birds of Mexico
Birds of the Sierra Madre Occidental
Birds of the Sierra Madre Oriental
Birds of the Sierra Madre del Sur
Birds of the Trans-Mexican Volcanic Belt